The HAZMAT Class 2 in United States law includes all gases which are compressed and stored for transportation.  Class 2 has three divisions: Flammable (also called combustible), Non-Flammable/Non-Poisonous, and Poisonous. This classification is based on the United Nations' Recommendations on the Transport of Dangerous Goods - Model Regulations. In Canada, the Transportation of Dangerous Goods Regulations, or TDGR, are also based on the UN Model Regulations and contain the same three divisions.

Divisions

A gas is a substance which
(a) at 50 °C (122 °F) has a vapor pressure greater than 300 kPa (43.51 PSI) or
(b) is completely gaseous at 20 °C (68 °F) at a standard pressure of 101.3 kPa (14.69 PSI).

Gases are assigned to one of three divisions

division 2.1 Flammable gas
division 2.2 Non flammable, Non-toxic gas
division 2.3 Toxic gas

Aerosols also fall into Class 2 divisions where an aerosol is defined as an article consisting of any non-refillable receptacle containing a gas compressed, liquefied or dissolved under pressure, the sole purpose of which is to expel a nonpoisonous (other than a Division 6.1 Packing Group III material) liquid, paste, or powder and fitted with a self-closing release device allowing the contents to be ejected by the gas.

Division 2.1: Flammable, Non-Toxic Gas

Flammable gas means any material that:
Is ignitable at 101.3 kPA (14.7 psia) when in a mixture of 13 percent or less by volume with air; or
Has a flammable range at 101.3 kPa with air of at least 12 percent regardless of the lower limit.
Is determined to be flammable in accordance with ASTM E681-85, Standard Test Method for Concentration Limits of Flammability of Chemicals

The following applies to aerosols:
An aerosol must be assigned to Division 2.1 if the contents include 85% by mass or more flammable components and the chemical heat of combustion is 30 kJ/g or more; 
An aerosol must be assigned to Division 2.1 if it is deemed flammable in accordance with the appropriate tests of the UN Manual of Tests and Criteria for flammability.

Division 2.2: Non-Flammable, Non-Toxic Gas

This division includes compressed gas, liquefied gas, pressurized cryogenic gas, compressed gas in solution, asphyxiant gas and oxidizing gas. A non-flammable, nonpoisonous compressed gas (Division 2.2) means any material (or mixture) which:

A non-flammable gas means any material that:
Exerts in the packaging an absolute pressure of 280 kPa (40.6 psia) or greater at 20 °C (68 °F), and
Does not meet the definition of Division 2.1 or 2.3.

The following applies to aerosols:
An aerosol must be assigned to Division 2.2 if the contents contain 1% by mass or less flammable components and the heat of combustion is less than 20 kJ/g.

Division 2.3: Toxic Gas

Gas poisonous by inhalation means a material which is a gas at 20 °C or less and a pressure of 101.3 kPa (a material which has a boiling point of 20 °C or less at 101.3kPa (14.7 psi)) and which:

Is known to be so toxic to humans as to pose a hazard to health during transportation, or
In the absence of adequate data on human toxicity, is presumed to be toxic to humans because when tested on laboratory animals it has an LC50 value of not more than 5000 ml/m3. See 49CFR 173.116(a) for assignment of Hazard Zones A, B, C or D. LC50 values for mixtures may be determined using the formula in 49 CFR 173.133(b)(1)(i)

Placards

Compatibility table

References 

United Nations, Recommendations on the Transport of Dangerous Goods - Model Regulations 
49 CFR 173.115 (a) (U.S. Code)
49 CFR 173.115 (b) (U.S. Code)
49 CFR 177.848 (U.S. Code)

Gases